Thurgauer Zeitung is a Swiss daily newspaper published in Frauenfeld, Switzerland. Founded in 1798 it is one of the oldest newspapers still in circulation.

History and profile
Thurgauer Zeitung was established in 1798. The publisher of the paper was Thurgauer Medien AG until October 2005 when Tamedia acquired the daily. Tamedia sold the paper to FPH Freie Presse Holding AG, a subsidiary of NZZ Media Group, in April 2010. Until that date the paper was published by Huber & Co. AG, a subsidiary of Tamedia.

Thurgauer Zeitung serves the canton of Thurgau and has its headquarters in Frauenfeld. The paper is part of Newsnet, a platform of daily newspapers in Switzerland.

In 1997 Thurgauer Zeitung sold 31,879 copies.

References

External links
 

18th-century establishments in Switzerland
Daily newspapers published in Switzerland
German-language newspapers published in Switzerland
Mass media in Frauenfeld
Publications established in 1798